Pudanu (also Romanized as Pūdanū; also known as Pūdan) is a village in Abnama Rural District, in the Central District of Rudan County, Hormozgan Province, Iran. At the 2006 census, its population was 23, in 5 families.

References 

Populated places in Rudan County